Statistics of J. League Cup, officially the '1998 J.League Yamazaki Nabisco Cup, in the 1998 season.

Overview
It was contested by 20 teams, and Jubilo Iwata won the cup.

Results

Group A

Group B

Group C

Group D

Semifinals
Shimizu S-Pulse 0–2 Jubilo Iwata
JEF United Ichihara 3–2 Kashima Antlers

Final

Jubilo Iwata 4–0 JEF United Ichihara
Jubilo Iwata won the cup.

References
rsssf
 J. League

J.League Cup
Lea